Robert Bruce "Bob" Bartlett (15 January 1927 – 19 February 2010) was an Australian professional rugby league footballer who played in the 1940s and 1950s, and Lawn Bowls player.

Background
Bartlett was born in Lithgow, New South Wales, and he died aged 83 in Wollongong, New South Wales.

Playing career

International honours
Bartlett represented British Empire XIII (RL) while at Leeds in the 10-23 defeat by France at Stade Chaban-Delmas, Bordeaux on Thursday 26 May 1949, and won caps for Other Nationalities (RL) while at Leeds in the 7-13 defeat by England at Derwent Park, Workington on Monday 19 September 1949, the 3-8 defeat by France at Stade Vélodrome, Marseille on Sunday 15 January 1950, and the 3-16 defeat by France at Stade Chaban-Delmas, Bordeaux on Sunday 10 December 1950.

State honours
Bartlett represented NSW Country Firsts (RL) in the 28-27 victory over New South Wales Town Firsts at Sydney Cricket Ground on Saturday 16 May 1953.

County League appearances
Bartlett played in Leeds' victory in the Yorkshire County League during the 1950–51 season.

Club career
Bartlett was transferred with Dennis Murphy from Bramley to Leeds in exchange for Joseph "Joe" Hulme and Dennis Warrior, he made his début for Leeds against York at Clarence Street, York on Saturday 29 January 1949.

Australian Sports Medal
Bartlett's sporting achievements were rewarded with an Australian Sports Medal in 2000.

Funeral
Bartlett's funeral took place at St Francis Xavier's Cathedral, Wollongong on Tuesday 23 February 2010, and was attended by family, friends, and dignitaries including former Lord Mayor of the City of Wollongong Alex Darling, former rugby league footballers Keith Barnes, Allan Fitzgibbon and Gus Miller, and rugby league administrators Bob Millward (father of Ian Millward), and Peter Newell (Illawarra Steelers chairman).

References

External links
Photograph "A new ground record - The 1950 Challenge Cup Semi-final between Warrington and Leeds set a new attendance record for Odsal of 69,898. Warrington defeated Leeds in the game by 16 points to 4. - Date: 01/01/1950" at rlhp.co.uk

1927 births
2010 deaths
Australian male bowls players
Bramley RLFC players
British Empire rugby league team players
Leeds Rhinos players
Manly Warringah Sea Eagles players
New South Wales rugby league team players
Other Nationalities rugby league team players
Rugby league centres
Rugby league players from Lithgow, New South Wales
Rugby league wingers